Cipriano is a surname. Notable people with the surname include:

 Gene Cipriano (1927-2022), American musician
 Joana Cipriano (1996–2004), Portuguese murder victim
 Joe Cipriano (born 1954), American voice actor
 Joe Cipriano (basketball) (1931–1980), American college basketball player
 Marcelo dos Santos Cipriano (born 1969), Brazilian-Portuguese footballer
 Marcos Antonio Aparecido Cipriano (born 1973), Brazilian footballer
 Olimpio Cipriano (born 1982), Angolan professional basketball player
 Petey Cipriano (born 1983), American-Cape-Verdean basketball coach and former player
 Renee Cipriano (21st century), American lobbyist
 Patch Cipriano, fictional character from the book Hush, hush
 Tucker Cipriano, convicted murderer
 Antonio Cipriano, American actor
 Kean Cipriano, Filipino singer